Frisilia heliapta is a moth in the family Lecithoceridae. It was described by Edward Meyrick in 1887. It is found in Sri Lanka.

The wingspan is about 14 mm. The forewings are reddish ochreous, with scattered black scales, especially towards the costa and inner margin. The base of the costa is dark fuscous and there is a black dot in the disc at one-third, and a second at two-thirds, as well as a blackish apical dot. The hindwings are pale grey, posteriorly paler and tinged with whitish ochreous.

References

Moths described in 1887
Frisilia